Luteoskyrin is a carcinogenic mycotoxin with the molecular formula C30H22O12 which is produced by the mold Penicillium islandicum. Luteoskyrin has strong cytotoxic effects. Luteoskyrin  can cause the yellow rice disease.

References

Further reading 

 
 
 
 

Mycotoxins
Polycyclic organic compounds